The Secretariat of the 11th Congress of the Russian Communist Party (Bolsheviks) was in session from 2 April 1922 to 25 April 1923.

11th Secretariat

References
 

Politburo of the Central Committee of the Communist Party of the Soviet Union members
Secretariat of the Central Committee of the Communist Party of the Soviet Union members
1922 establishments in Russia
1923 disestablishments in the Soviet Union